In Greek mythology, Lelante is a minor figure, a queen of the Molossians, who was transformed into a bird by the will of Zeus, the god of justice, in order to escape a fiery death.

Family 
She was the wife of the Molossian king Munichus and the mother by him of three sons, Philaeus, Alcander and Megaletor, and of a daughter Hyperippe.

Mythology 
The entire family was seen as just and righteous and therefore especially favored by the gods. One day raiders attacked them in the fields; the family ran off to their house and began to throw various objects at them in self-defense, whereupon the offenders set the house ablaze. The god of justice, Zeus would not let his favourites suffer such a cruel and undeserving death that he changed them all six of them into various birds; Lelante became a green woodpecker.

See also 

 Artemiche
 Erodius
 Hippodamia

References

Bibliography 
 Antoninus Liberalis, The Metamorphoses of Antoninus Liberalis translated by Francis Celoria (Routledge 1992). Online version at the Topos Text Project.
 
 Ovid, Metamorphoses, Volume II: Books 9-15. Translated by Frank Justus Miller. Revised by G. P. Goold. Loeb Classical Library 43. Cambridge, MA: Harvard University Press, 1916.

Deeds of Zeus
Queens in Greek mythology
Metamorphoses into birds in Greek mythology
Epirotic mythology